The 1986 United States Senate election in North Carolina was held on November 4, 1986 as part of the nationwide elections to the Senate. Incumbent Republican U.S. Senator Jim Broyhill, who had been appointed in June 1986 to serve out the rest of John Porter East's term, faced off against the popular Democratic former Governor Terry Sanford. 

There were two separate elections held on the same day: a special election for what little remained of the 99th United States Congress (November 1986-January 1987) and a regular election for a new six-year term (beginning in January 1987). The primary elections were designed to nominate the same candidates to both the special and the regular election. Sanford won both elections.

Democratic primary
Terry Sanford, then the outgoing president of Duke University, first said in September 1985 that he was planning to run for the U.S. Senate the next year but quickly withdrew, as it appeared that the party wanted a "fresh" face, most likely in the person of UNC System President William Friday. Then, Friday declined to run, as did other well-known politicians like former Governor Jim Hunt. 

Former North Carolina Secretary of Commerce Lauch Faircloth then made it known that he would run, but he was considered too conservative by many party leaders, who encouraged Sanford to enter the race in order to defeat Faircloth. Sanford agreed to run, which led Faircloth and another candidate, Judge Marvin K. Blount Jr., to withdraw before filing their candidacies. Six years later, Faircloth did run for the Senate against Sanford, but this time as a Republican, in which he was victorious.

Candidates 
 Walt Atkins
 William Belk, Belk department store executive and former president of Young Democrats of America
 Katherine Harper, business executive
 John Ingram, former North Carolina Commissioner of Insurance
 Theodore Kinney, real estate agent and African-American political activist
 T. L. "Fountain" Odom, Mecklenburg County commissioner and attorney (later a state senator)
 Terry Sanford, former Governor
 Betty Wallace, educator and deputy superintendent of North Carolina Department of Public Instruction

Results

Republican primary
Senator East declined to run for a second term, citing his health. Longtime U.S. Representative Jim Broyhill entered the race with much of the establishment support, but David Funderburk had the backing of the organization of Senator Jesse Helms. Funderburk charged Broyhill with being insufficiently conservative, but in the end, Broyhill won the nomination handily in the May primary. The next month, East committed suicide, and Governor James G. Martin appointed Broyhill to his seat.

Candidates 
 Jim Broyhill, incumbent U.S. Senator and U.S. Congressman
 David Funderburk, former U.S. Ambassador to Romania (later a U.S. Congressman)
 Glenn Miller, perennial candidate

Results

General election

Candidates 
 Jim Broyhill (R), incumbent U.S. Senator
 Terry Sanford (D), former Governor

Results

Special election

Candidates 
 Jim Broyhill (R), incumbent U.S. Senator and U.S. Congressman
 Terry Sanford (D), former Governor

Results

See also
1986 United States Senate elections

References

1986
North Carolina
1986 North Carolina elections